Grantham is a neighbourhood in the city of St. Catharines, Ontario, Canada. The community is bordered on the west by Geneva Street, on the east by the Welland Canal, on the north by Parnell Road, and on the south by Scott Street.
This neighbourhood is composed of mainly low density residential properties. Grantham can be divided into Grantham East and Grantham West with Niagara Regional Road 48 being the dividing line.

Parks
Parks:
 Grantham Avenue Park
 Guy Road Park
 Harcove Park
 Lockview Park
 Louis Park
 Monarch Park
 Realty Park
 Tecumseh Park
 Walker's Creek Park

Schools
Public Schools:
 Dalewood French Immersion Public School
 Governor Simcoe Secondary School
 Lockview Public School
 Prince Philip Public School
Catholic Schools:
 Holy Cross Catholic Secondary School (St. Catharines)
 Our Lady of Fatima Catholic Elementary School
Private Schools:
 Wheatley School, St. Catharines

References

Neighbourhoods in St. Catharines